Lobelia appendiculata is a species of flowering plant in the bellflower family known by the common name pale lobelia. It is found in the south-central portion of North America.

References

appendiculata
Flora of Arkansas
Plants described in 1839